The Vermont Lunar CubeSat is a CubeSat satellite by Vermont Technical College and funded in part by grants from NASA, Vermont Space Grant Consortium and in part by voluntary donations. The satellite, costing about 50,000 US Dollars to build - with NASA offering a free launch as part of the ELaNa program - served as a testing model for guidance and navigation pending future launches. The eventual goal of the project is to build a CubeSat capable of orbiting the Moon.

It was launched on November 19, 2013 from Wallops Flight Facility in Virginia as part of a payload containing two NASA, 11 university, one high school and 14 Air Force CubeSats.  Vermont Lunar is the only non NASA/Air Force CubeSat from this ELaNa IV launch that is fully working.  Eight were never heard from at all. SPARK/Ada 2005 was used, and this is the first spacecraft of any kind programmed in SPARK. The control software contained about 10,000 lines of SPARK/Ada code. The Principal Investigator was Carl Brandon, the Software Supervisor was Peter Chapin, and Dan Turner served as the Principal Developer. This was the first satellite of any kind built by a college or university in New England.

See also

Lunar CubeSats in development
Lunar IceCube
Lunar Flashlight
Lunar Polar Hydrogen Mapper

References

Spacecraft launched in 2013
CubeSats